Simon Anthony Fox Ward (16 October 194120 July 2012) was a British stage and film actor. He was known chiefly for his performance as Winston Churchill in the 1972 film Young Winston. He played many other screen roles, including those of Sir Monty Everard in Judge John Deed and Bishop Gardiner in The Tudors.

Early life and education
Simon Ward was born on 16 October 1941 in Beckenham, Kent, the son of Winifred and Leonard Fox Ward, a car dealer.

From an early age he wanted to be an actor. He received his formal education at Alleyn's School, London, the home of the National Youth Theatre, which he joined at age 13 and stayed with for eight years. He then trained at the Royal Academy of Dramatic Art.

Career
Ward made his professional stage debut with the Northampton Repertory in 1963, and his London theatrical debut one year later in The 4th of June. He worked in repertory in Northampton, Birmingham and Oxford and occasionally in London's West End.

His big break in theatre came in 1966 when he played Dennis in Joe Orton's Loot, which led to a number of small film and television roles. All of Ward's major film roles were in the 1970s.

His first film appearance was probably an uncredited role as one of the sociopathic students in Lindsay Anderson's If.... (1968). He was primarily a stage actor when selected to play the title role in Young Winston in 1971, the role which brought him to national prominence. The in-demand Ward starred in several high-profile films during the remainder of the 1970s.

In 1973 he played the Duke of Buckingham in Richard Lester's The Three Musketeers and in 1974 appeared in its sequel The Four Musketeers. Also in 1974 he played author-veterinarian James Herriot in the successful film adaptation of All Creatures Great and Small. He played one of the lead roles (Lt. Crawford) in the 1976 World War I film Aces High, then starred as Lt. William Vereker in the 1979 film Zulu Dawn. He was also seen as Captain Hoffman, a fictional Nazi functionary, in Hitler: The Last Ten Days (1973). Later film roles included Zor-El in Supergirl (1984).

In 1986, Ward starred in the title role of Ross, the first West End revival of Terence Rattigan's play since its original run in 1960. It toured the UK and, after a run at the Royal Alexandra Theatre, Toronto, opened at The Old Vic, featuring Marc Sinden as Dickinson, with David Langton, Roland Curram, Bruce Montague and Ernest Clark in supporting roles.

Ward made few films after the 1970s, although he did have a major role in the Ralph Fiennes version of Wuthering Heights (1992), alongside his daughter Sophie Ward.

In 1987 he sustained a serious head injury in a street attack, the circumstances of which were obscure. He believed the attack, which left him with a broken skull that needed brain surgery, caused the chronic blood disorder, polycythaemia that affected his career.

In 1995, at very short notice, he took over Stephen Fry's role in the play Cell Mates, after Fry walked out of the play near the start of its run.

In 2001–07, he appeared as Sir Monty Everard in the BBC television series Judge John Deed and in 2007–10 as Bishop Stephen Gardiner in The Tudors.

In 2010, Ward appeared in the title role in the British tour of Alan Bennett's play The Madness of George III.

Death

Having been afflicted with ill health in his later years, Ward died at the age of 70 on 20 July 2012 in Taunton, Somerset. His body was buried on the East Side of Highgate Cemetery in London.

A memorial service was held in his memory at St Paul's Church, Covent Garden, London, on 9 July 2013.

Personal life
In 1964, Ward married Alexandra Malcolm, whom he met while they were students at RADA. They had three daughters: Sophie, Claudia and Kitty.

Filmography

Film

Television

References

External links

Simon Ward at Aveleyman
Simon Ward at BFI

1941 births
2012 deaths
Burials at Highgate Cemetery
Male actors from London
Alumni of RADA
National Youth Theatre members
English male film actors
English male stage actors
English male television actors
People educated at Alleyn's School